

121001–121100 

|-
| 121001 Liangshanxichang ||  || Liangshan Yi Autonomous Prefecture in Sichuan province, P.R. China has a population of 5.15 million from multiple ethnic groups, including the largest population of ethnic Yi nationally. The capital of Liangshan is Xichang, where China's Chang'e-1, 2, and 3 lunar orbiters, lander and rover were launched. || 
|-id=007
| 121007 Jiaxingnanhu ||  || "Jiaxing nanhu"are the Chinese characters for "South Lake of Jiaxing City". South Lake is one of the three most famous lakes in Zhejiang Province, and is among the most highest-rated scenic areas in China. || 
|-id=008
| 121008 Michellecrigger ||  || Michelle Crigger (born 1981) worked on the OSIRIS-REx asteroid sample-return mission as a Financial Manager. Prior to this role, she provided resource and programmatic support to the Goddard Spaceflight Center CFO Office, Astrophysics Project Division and the ExPRESS Logistics Carrier Project at NASA. || 
|-id=016
| 121016 Christopharnold ||  || Christoph Arnold (1650–1695), German amateur astronomer who observed the 1690 transit of Mercury || 
|-id=019
| 121019 Minodamato ||  || Mino Damato (1937–2010), Italian astronomy communicator known for his TV series In viaggio tra le stelle ("A Journey among the Stars") in the 1970s. || 
|-id=022
| 121022 Galliano ||  || Richard Galliano (born 1950), a French accordionist. || 
|-id=032
| 121032 Wadesisler ||  || Wade Sisler (born 1959) is the Executive Producer at NASA's Goddard Space Flight Center. Wade supports a team of video producers, science animators, web editors, and social media wranglers in their quest to share the story of the OSIRIS-REx asteroid sample-return mission. || 
|-id=089
| 121089 Vyšší Brod ||  || The monastery of Vyšší Brod (Hohenfurth), founded by the Rozmberks near this market town in 1259 || 
|}

121101–121200 

|-id=103
| 121103 Ericneilsen ||  || Eric Neilsen (born 1970), American astronomer with the Sloan Digital Sky Survey || 
|-id=121
| 121121 Koyoharugotoge ||  || Koyoharu Gotōge (born 1988) is a Japanese mangaka and the author of the manga Demon Slayer: Kimetsu no Yaiba, which inspired the realization of the popular anime series with the same name. || 
|-id=132
| 121132 Garydavis ||  || Gary T. Davis (born 1969) contributed to the OSIRIS-REx asteroid sample-return mission as a Spacecraft Systems Engineer. || 
|-id=133
| 121133 Kenflurchick ||  || Ken Flurchick (1951–2018) enjoyed a successful career at North Carolina A&T in the field of supercomputers. He published extensively in the fields of computational physics, astronomy, chemistry, and engineering, and also taught a wide variety of courses in these areas. || 
|}

121201–121300 

|-id=211
| 121211 Nikeshadavis ||  || Nikesha Davis (born 1983) is the deputy lead NASA Attitude Control Analyst for the OSIRIS-REx asteroid sample-return mission. Prior to serving in this role, she worked as an Attitude Control Analyst on the Global Precipitation Measurement Mission and the proposal team for the GEDI Mission || 
|-id=232
| 121232 Zerin ||  || ZERIN is the Center for Ries Crater and Impact Studies Nördlingen, a scientific institute for impact research and, in particular, documentation of the Nördlinger Ries Crater (Src). || 
|-id=236
| 121236 Adrianagutierrez ||  || Adriana Manrique Gutierrez (born 1986), an animator at NASA Goddard's Conceptual Image Lab. She is part of the production team working on a series of animated films for the OSIRIS-REx asteroid sample-return mission || 
|-id=237
| 121237 Zachdolch ||  || Zachary Dolch (born 1984), a planner/scheduler for the OSIRIS-REx asteroid sample-return mission. || 
|}

121301–121400 

|-id=313
| 121313 Tamsin ||  || Frank Tamsin (born 1964), Belgian amateur astronomer, editor of the Belgian astronomical magazine Heelal since 1998 and secretary general of the Flemish Amateur Astronomers Association (Vereniging Voor Sterrenkunde, VVS) and the Public Observatory Beisbroek (Volkssterrenwacht vzw Beisbroek/Observatoire de Beisbroek) in Bruges || 
|-id=315
| 121315 Mikelentz ||  || Michael W. Lentz (born 1968) is an artist in the Conceptual Image Lab at GSFC. He worked for over three years to develop art and animation for the OSIRIS-REx asteroid sample-return mission to illustrate the scope and magnitude of the scientific endeavor to study the asteroid Bennu || 
|-id=327
| 121327 Andreweaker ||  || Andrew C. Eaker (born 1961) contributed to the OSIRIS-REx asteroid sample-return mission as Project Scheduler. Prior missions include LRO (Lunar Reconnaissance Orbiter) and GLAST (Gamma-Ray Large Area Space Telescope). || 
|-id=328
| 121328 Devlynrfennell ||  || Devlyn R. Fennell (born 1978) contributed to the OSIRIS-REx asteroid sample-return mission on Data/Configuration Management. || 
|-id=329
| 121329 Getzandanner ||  || Kenneth M. Getzandanner (born 1988), an Aerospace Engineer at NASA Goddard Space Flight Center, contributed to the OSIRIS-REx asteroid sample-return mission as a member of the Flight Dynamics Team. || 
|-id=330
| 121330 Colbygoodloe ||  || Colby Goodloe (born 1982) contributed to the NASA OSIRIS-REx Asteroid Sample Return Mission as a systems engineer. Prior to the OSIRIS-REx mission, he served as an electrical engineer on many other NASA missions. || 
|-id=331
| 121331 Savannahsalazar ||  || Savannah J. Salazar (born 1995) worked as a student employee on the OSIRIS-REx asteroid sample-return mission at the University of Arizona's Lunar and Planetary Lab, helping to organize the naming of asteroids for team members. || 
|-id=332
| 121332 Jasonhair ||  || Jason Hair (born 1977), the Visible and near InfraRed Spectrometer Instrument Manager for the OSIRIS-REx asteroid sample-return mission, overseeing instrument development, integration and testing. || 
|-id=352
| 121352 Taylorhale ||  || Taylor Hale (born 1965) is an instrument systems engineer for the OSIRIS-REx asteroid sample-return mission. Prior to OSIRIS-REx, he was the lead engineer on the Landsat-8 Thermal Infrared Sensor instrument developed at Goddard. || 
|}

121401–121500 

|-id=468
| 121468 Msovinskihaskell ||  || Marjorie (Sovinski) Haskell (born 1979) is the Materials and Processes Engineer for the OSIRIS-REx asteroid sample-return mission and the OVIRS instrument. Prior to OSIRIS-REx, she served as the MPE for the SMAP Radiometer and has also supported the Solar Orbiter, LCRD, and ASTRO-H programs as MPE. || 
|-id=469
| 121469 Sarahaugh ||  || Sara Haugh (born 1970) contributed to the OSIRIS-REx asteroid sample-return mission as a Software Systems Engineer. Previously, she served as a Software Systems Engineer for the MAVEN Mission, the ISIM FSW Test Lead for the JWST Mission, and a Flight Operations Team member for the Terra and Aqua Missions. || 
|-id=479
| 121479 Hendershot ||  || James Hendershot (born 1957), the Payload Team Instrument Manager at Goddard Space Flight Center for the OCAMS and OTES instruments on the OSIRIS-REx asteroid sample-return mission. || 
|-id=480
| 121480 Dolanhighsmith ||  || Dolan E. Highsmith (born 1970) contributed to the Navigation Teams of the ESA Mars Express mission and the NASA MRO, MSL, MAVEN and OSIRIS-REx asteroid sample-return mission. || 
|-id=481
| 121481 Reganhoward ||  || Regan Howard (born 1948) contributed to the OSIRIS-REx asteroid sample-return mission as the Electromagnetics Compatibility Lead. He is a member of the MAVEN flight team. He was a systems engineer on the MAVEN Mars Scout mission and on the development teams for the Dawn, MESSENGER and ICESat-1 missions. || 
|-id=483
| 121483 Griffinjayne ||  || Griffin Owen Jayne (born 1992) contributed to the OSIRIS-REx asteroid sample-return mission as Contamination Control Engineer. He also works as a Thermal Coatings Development Engineer, helping to improve existing coatings and develop new coatings to better meet mission thermal requirements. || 
|-id=486
| 121486 Sarahkirby ||  || Sarah Kirby Smith (born 1982) is the Earned Value Management Specialist for the OSIRIS-REx asteroid sample-return mission. She also worked at the Naval Air Systems Command on the F35 Joint Strike Fighter and at Lockheed Martin on the Littoral Combat Ship and Non-Line of Sight Launch System projects. || 
|}

121501–121600 

|-id=505
| 121505 Andrewliounis ||  || Andrew J. Liounis (born 1991) contributed to the OSIRIS-REx asteroid sample-return mission as an Optical Navigation engineer. || 
|-id=506
| 121506 Chrislorentson ||  || C. Chris Lorentson (born 1968) contributed to the OSIRIS-REx asteroid sample-return mission, Lunar Reconnaissance Orbiter, Mars Science Laboratory, Hubble Space Telescope, SWIFT, GLAST and Cassini Missions as a Contamination Control Engineer for NASA-Goddard Space Flight Center. || 
|-id=536
| 121536 Brianburt ||  || Brian J. Burt (born 1987) is a software developer at Lowell Observatory (Flagstaff, AZ). His research includes spectroscopic studies of asteroids and he has made significant contributions to the MITHNEOS and MANOS near-earth asteroid spectral surveys. || 
|-id=537
| 121537 Lorenzdavid ||  || David Lorenz (born 1958) is the Touch and Go Campaign lead for the OSIRIS-REx asteroid sample-return mission. David was responsible for returning Landsat-4 to full operations following an on-orbit failure. He has worked on the Solar Max Repair Mission, the UARS mission and various GOES spacecraft || 
|-id=540
| 121540 Jamesmarsh ||  || Jimmy Marsh (born 1969) contributed to the OSIRIS-REx asteroid sample-return mission as Proposal Manager. || 
|-id=542
| 121542 Alindamashiku ||  || Alinda K. Mashiku (born 1982), an aerospace engineer at NASA's Goddard Space Flight Center, is a member of the Flight Dynamics Team for the OSIRIS-REx asteroid sample-return mission, investigating nonlinear and hybrid estimation techniques for statistical orbit determination and aerocapture analysis. || 
|-id=547
| 121547 Fenghuotongxin ||  || Fenghuotongxin are the Chinese characters for "beacon" and "communication". A beacon, which utilizes a fire burning atop a hill or tower to send visual signals, is an ancient communication method documented as early as 781 BC. in China. Ancient beacon towers are still retained on the Great Wall and in some cities. || 
|-id=557
| 121557 Paulmason ||  || Paul Mason (born 1966) is the lead NASA Attitude Control Analyst for the OSIRIS-REx asteroid sample-return mission. He also worked as an Attitude Control Analyst on the Solar Dynamics Observatory, LADEE, and SPIRIT Missions to name a few || 
|-id=593
| 121593 Kevinmiller ||  || Kevin Miller (born 1957) contributed to the OSIRIS-REx asteroid sample-return mission as a member of the proposal team then as the first Deputy Project Manager/Resources. He has worked for NASA Goddard Space Flight Center since 1989 in project management on numerous space flight missions. || 
|-id=594
| 121594 Zubritsky ||  || Elizabeth Zubritsky (born 1967) supports the OSIRIS-REx asteroid sample-return mission at NASA's Goddard Space Flight Center by writing news releases and assisting with media relations. She serves the planetary science community by promoting fundamental research and missions like OSIRIS-REx, MAVEN and LRO || 
|}

121601–121700 

|-id=608
| 121608 Mikemoreau ||  || Michael C. Moreau (born 1972), an engineer at NASA's Goddard Space Flight Center, leads the Navigation Team for the OSIRIS-REx asteroid sample-return mission. He grew up on a dairy farm in Vermont, and is known for his contributions to techniques for autonomous spacecraft navigation || 
|-id=609
| 121609 Josephnicholas ||  || Joseph B. Nicholas (born 1988) contributed to the OSIRIS-REx asteroid sample-return mission as tracking data analysis algorithm developer. He has also worked on developing high-degree lunar gravity fields as part of the GRAIL gravity team at NASA GSFC || 
|-id=615
| 121615 Marknoteware ||  || Mark D. Noteware (born 1958) contributed to the OSIRIS-REx asteroid sample-return mission as Mission Assurance Engineer. He served previously as Senior Quality Engineer for DSCOVR program, Advanced Seal Delivery System Quality Engineer, and Bio-Detection System Quality Engineer. || 
|-id=631
| 121631 Josephnuth ||  || Joseph A. Nuth (born 1953) contributed to the OSIRIS-REx asteroid sample-return mission as Deputy Project Scientist, and is the Senior Scientist for Primitive Bodies at Goddard Space Flight Center. He served as Chief of the GSFC Astrochemistry Lab and Discipline Scientist for the Origins of Solar Systems Programs. || 
|-id=633
| 121633 Ronperison ||  || Ronald Perison (born 1962) contributed to the OSIRIS-REx asteroid sample-return mission as the Chief Safety and Mission Assurance Officer. His 28 years of aerospace experience in aircraft and satellite systems includes the USAF, Johns Hopkins University and NASA on the TIMED, Hubble Space Telescope and THEMIS missions. || 
|-id=637
| 121637 Druscillaperry ||  || Druscilla D. Perry (born 1961) is the OVIRS Resource Analyst for the OSIRIS-REx asteroid sample-return mission. She was also part of the Resources Team for the Magnetospheric Multiscale Mission and a Financial Analyst for the Multidisciplinary Engineering and Technology Support Contract as part of the Business Management Office Team || 
|-id=654
| 121654 Michaelpryzby ||  || Michael S. Pryzby (born 1967) is the Instrument Systems Engineer on the OSIRIS-REx asteroid sample-return mission. Prior to this, he was the Lead Spacecraft Systems Engineer on the Lunar Reconnaissance Orbiter. In his career, he has supported NASA GSFC for over 25 years || 
|-id=655
| 121655 Nitapszcolka ||  || Nita Aanderud Pszcolka (born 1965) is the Project Support Manager for the OSIRIS-REx asteroid sample-return mission. She is a member of the Goddard business support team utilizing project support skills and techniques for the planning, direction, coordination and evaluation of all project support activities || 
|-id=656
| 121656 Jamesrogers ||  || James E. Rogers (born 1964) is the Planning and Scheduling Lead for the OSIRIS-REx asteroid sample-return mission. He also was the Planning and Scheduling Lead for the TDRS K/L and STEREO Missions, and a Scheduling Team Member on several Hubble Servicing Missions. || 
|-id=659
| 121659 Blairrussell ||  || Blair Russell (born 1970) provided mechanical engineering oversight of hardware development for the OSIRIS-REx asteroid sample-return mission. Working closely with spacecraft and instrument teams, he ensured a robust, structurally sound mechanical system. Prior to this work he supported the GPM and JWST Missions. || 
|}

121701–121800 

|-id=715
| 121715 Katiesalamy ||  || Katie Baumann Salamy (born 1985), the Mechanical Systems Division Lead Secretary at NASA Goddard Space Flight Center. || 
|-id=716
| 121716 Victorsank ||  || Victor J. Sank (born 1944), the radio-frequency communications System Lead for the OSIRIS-REx asteroid sample-return mission. || 
|-id=717
| 121717 Josephschepis ||  || Named in appreciation of Joseph P. Schepis (born 1960), whose accomplishments include numerous structures and mechanisms used in space science and Earth science missions. He contributed to the OSIRIS-REx asteroid sample-return mission as the Mechanical System Lead. || 
|-id=718
| 121718 Ashleyscroggins ||  || Ashley R. Scroggins (born 1984) worked on the OSIRIS-REx asteroid sample-return mission as a Propulsion Engineer. She also supported the GEDI, DSCOVR, GPM, Glory, LRO and SDO missions as a Propulsion Engineer at NASA Goddard Spaceflight Center || 
|-id=719
| 121719 Georgeshaw ||  || George B. Shaw (born 1966) contributed to the OSIRIS-REx asteroid sample-return mission as Laser Systems Lead. Prior to serving in this role, he was Laser Transmitter Lead Engineer for the LOLA instrument on the NASA LRO Mission. || 
|-id=725
| 121725 Aphidas ||  || Aphidas (or Apheidas) is a centaur from Greek mythology who remained in a drunken sleep during the battle between the Centaurs and Lapiths The Lapith Phorbas killed Aphidas with a thrown spear while he slept. || 
|-id=756
| 121756 Sotomejias ||  || Vanessa Soto-Mejias (born 1982) contributed to the OSIRIS-REx asteroid sample-return mission as Resource Analyst. || 
|}

121801–121900 

|-id=817
| 121817 Szatmáry ||  || Károly Szatmáry (born 1956), Hungarian astronomer || 
|-id=865
| 121865 Dauvergne ||  || Jean Luc Dauvergne (born 1976), French scientific journalist || 
|}

121901–122000 

|-bgcolor=#f2f2f2
| colspan=4 align=center | 
|}

References 

121001-122000